Cahide Sonku (born Cahide Serap; 27 December 1919 – 18 March 1981) was a Turkish actress, model, writer and the first female film director in Turkey. Sonku was the founder of her own movie production company, Sonku Film, in 1950. She was thrice married and divorced.

Life 
Sonku' first theater and cinema experience was during her secondary school education. She was accepted into Darülbedayi when she was only 16 years old, and in time she took her place among the most popular actors of Istanbul City Theatres. She started acting with "Seven Village Zeynebi" first at the People's Houses Theater, then at the Istanbul Municipality Conservatory, and then at Darülbedayi (1932-City Theaters), discovered by Muhsin Ertuğrul who was an important figure in Sonku's career.

Sonku founded the production company "Sonku Film" in 1950 and however went bankrupt in 1963 due to a fire that burned down the company building. She continued working at the City Theater through Muhsin Ertuğrul's influence, then left and struggled with alcohol addiction in the last years of her life.

Sonku received the Turkish Film Critics Association service award in 1979 and died in 1981 at the Alkazar Cinema in Istanbul, at the age of 61. She was buried in Zincirlikuyu Cemetery. Cahide Sonku Prize is awarded in her memory at the annual Antalya Golden Orange Film Festival.

Filmography

References

External links

 

1919 births
1981 deaths
Actresses from Istanbul
Turkish film actresses
Turkish film directors
20th-century Turkish actresses
Yemeni emigrants
Immigrants to Turkey